Henry Price was an Irish Anglican priest in the late  17th and early 18th centuries.

He was Treasurer  and Prebendary of Kildare from 1674 until 1706 when he became Dean of Cashel, a post he held until his death in 1706.

References

Deans of Cashel
1706 deaths
Fellows of Trinity College Dublin